Azospira restricta is a species of nitrogen-fixing bacteria. It is a root bacteria and together with Azospira oryzae they are the two species in the genus. It is Gram-negative, non-spore-forming, with straight to curved rod-shaped cells with a single polar flagellum. The type strain is SUA2T (=NRRL B-41660T=DSM 18626T=LMG 23819T).

References

Further reading
Whitman, William B., et al., eds. Bergey's manual® of systematic bacteriology. Vol. 2. Springer, 2012.

External links

LPSN
Type strain of Azospira restricta at BacDive -  the Bacterial Diversity Metadatabase

Rhodocyclaceae
Bacteria described in 2007